The 2019/20 NTFL season was the 99th season of the Northern Territory Football League (NTFL).

The first game was played on Saturday, 5 October, and the Grand Final was played on Saturday, 14 March, with the Nightcliff Tigers winning the match by 13 points against St Marys, claiming their fifth premiership title in history. This was the first time in the club's history going back to back in titles.

Ladder

Ladder progression

Finals

Grand Final

References 

Northern Territory Football League seasons
NTFL